The Loddon Valley Football Netball League is an Australian rules football league based in Central Victoria.

History
The league was formed in 1903 by the Inglewood, Bridgewater, Newbridge and Arnold’s Bridge clubs.

Inglewood and Bridgewater withdrew in 1908 to form the Korong District Central Association with Korong Vale and Wedderburn.  The Loddon Valley Association remained based around the Newbridge area until the Bridgewater and Inglewood clubs returned in the late 1930s.

The centre of the league shifted to Inglewood with the inclusion of Bears Lagoon - Serpentine after WW2.

Gradually the smaller clubs such as Rheola, Logan, Arnold’s Bridge and Bealiba folded or left the competition until in 1956 northern clubs Calivil, Mitiamo and Yarrawalla were admitted.

A junior competition was introduced in 1959, and Reserves competition in 1970.

Clubs

Current Clubs

League Awards and Honours

Premierships

	1903	Inglewood
	1904	Dunolly
	1905	Bridgewater
	1906	Bridgewater
	1907	Newbridge
	1908	Newbridge
	1909	Newbridge
	1910	Newbridge
	1911	Laanecoorie
	1912	Newbridge
	1913	Laanecoorie
	1914	Newbridge
	1915	Bridgewater
	1916	- 1918 WWI
	1919	Laanecoorie
	1920	Laanecoorie
	1921	Laanecoorie
	1922	Laanecoorie
	1923	Shelbourne
	1924	Arnold
	1925	Shelbourne
	1926	Shelbourne
	1927	Eddington
	1928	Eddington
	1929	Newbridge
	1930	Newbridge
	1931	Tarnagulla
	1932	Tarnagulla
	1933	Newbridge

	1934	Woodstock
	1935	Woodstock
	1936	Laanecoorie
	1937	Laanecoorie
	1938	Bridgewater
	1939	Bridgewater
	1940	- 1944 WWII
	1945	Bridgewater
	1946	Inglewood
	1947	BL-Serpentine
	1948	BL-Serpentine
	1949	BL-Serpentine
	1950	Bridgewater
	1951	Inglewood
	1952	Bealiba
	1953	Inglewood
	1954	Inglewood
	1955	Bridgewater
	1956	Inglewood
	1957	Newbridge
	1958	Inglewood
	1959	Bridgewater
	1960	BL-Serpentine
	1961	BL-Serpentine
	1962	Bridgewater
	1963	Bridgewater
	1964	Calivil
	1965	BL-Serpentine
	1966	BL-Serpentine

	1967	Mitiamo
	1968	Calivil
	1969	Calivil
	1970	Calivil
	1971	Inglewood
	1972	Yarrawalla
	1973	Yarrawalla
	1974	Bridgewater
	1975	Yarrawalla
	1976	Bridgewater
	1977	Mitiamo
	1978	Newbridge
	1979	Mitiamo
	1980	Bridgewater
	1981	Korong Vale
	1982	BL-Serpentine
	1983	BL-Serpentine
	1984	Bridgewater
	1985	Bridgewater
	1986	Inglewood
	1987	YCW
	1988	Bridgewater
	1989	Marong
	1990	Calivil
	1991	Bridgewater
	1992	BL-Serpentine
	1993	Newbridge
	1994	BL-Serpentine
	1995	BL-Serpentine

	1996	Calivil
	1997	YCW
	1998	Calivil 
	1999	Mitiamo
	2000	Newbridge
	2001	YCW
	2002	YCW
	2003	Calivil 
	2004	Calivil 
	2005	Calivil 
	2006	Calivil 
	2007	Calivil 
	2008	Calivil 
	2009	Mitiamo
	2010	Bridgewater
	2011	Bridgewater
	2012	Bridgewater
	2013	Bridgewater
	2014	Bridgewater
	2015	Bridgewater
	2016	Bridgewater
	2017	Calivil 
	2018	Newbridge
   2019    Mitiamo
   2020   Season cancelled due to COVID-19 pandemic
   2021   Finals abandoned due to COVID-19 pandemic
   2022   Marong

Current Finals System

Finals Format

Week one
 Qualifying Final: 2nd ranked team meets 3rd ranked team. Winner proceeds to Week 2 (2nd Semi Final). Loser proceeds to Week 2 (1st Semi Final).
 Elimination Final: 4th ranked team meets 5th ranked team. Winner proceeds to Week 2 (1st Semi Final). Loser is Eliminated.

Week two
 1st Semi Final: Loser of Qualifying Final meets winner of Elimination Final. Winner proceeds to Week 3 (Preliminary Final). Loser is Eliminated.
 2nd Semi Final: 1st ranked team meets winner of Qualifying Final. Winner proceeds to Week 4 (Grand Final). Loser proceeds to Week 3 (Preliminary Final).

Week three
 Preliminary Final: Loser of 2nd Semi Final meets winner of 1st Semi Final. Winner proceeds to Week 4 (Grand Final). Loser is Eliminated.

Week four
 Grand Final: Winner of 2nd Semi Final meets winner of Preliminary Final. Winner is crowned Premier.

Season Results

2001 Ladder

2002 Ladder

2003 Ladder

2004 Ladder

2005 Ladder

2006 Ladder

2007 Ladder

2008 Ladder

2009 Ladder

2010 Ladder

2011 Ladder

2012 Ladder

2013 Ladder

2014 Ladder

2015 Ladder

2016 Ladder

2017 Ladder

2018 Ladder

2019 Ladder

2020 Ladder

2021 Ladder		
Home & Away Season was reduced by 5 rounds and Finals series abandoned due to COVID-19 pandemic in Victoria

2022 Ladder

References

External links 
League website

Australian rules football competitions in Victoria (Australia)
Netball leagues in Victoria (Australia)
Sports leagues established in 1903
1903 establishments in Australia